Stuart Bruce Conn (born 11 March 1953) is a former New Zealand rugby union player and a sworn officer of the New Zealand Police. Primarily a flanker but also a number 8 and lock, Conn played his club rugby for Grammar Old Boys and represented Auckland and, briefly, Hawke's Bay at a provincial level. Conn was a member of the New Zealand national side, the All Blacks, in 1976 and 1980. He played six games for the All Blacks but did not appear in any test matches.

References

1953 births
Living people
Rugby union players from Whakatāne
People educated at Tauranga Boys' College
New Zealand rugby union players
New Zealand international rugby union players
Auckland rugby union players
Hawke's Bay rugby union players
Rugby union flankers